Below are the squads for the Football at the 2005 Southeast Asian Games, hosted by the Philippines, which took place between 1 and 14 December 2005.

Group A

Philippines 
Coach: Aris Caslib

Thailand 
Coach: Charnwit Polcheewin

Malaysia 
Coach: Norizan Bakar

Cambodia 
Coach:

Group B

Vietnam 
Coach:  Alfred Riedl

Singapore 
Coach:

Indonesia 
Coach:  Peter Withe

Laos 
Coach: Bounlap Khenkitisack

Myanmar 
Coach:  Ivan Kolev

References

External links 

Football at the 2005 Southeast Asian Games